Chengdu University of TCM & Sichuan Provincial People's Hospital is a transfer station on Line 2, Line 4 and Line 5 of the Chengdu Metro in China. The station serves the nearby Chengdu University of Traditional Chinese Medicine.

References

Railway stations in Sichuan
Railway stations in China opened in 2012
Chengdu Metro stations